Lorenzo Williams (born October 23, 1984) is a former American football defensive tackle. He played college football at Missouri.

Williams has been a member of the Baltimore Ravens, Montreal Alouettes and Carolina Panthers.

College career
As a redshirt freshman, Williams played in eleven games, making 21 tackles and 1 sack, with his best game coming against Kansas when he made 6 tackles. He also had 3 tackles against Troy, Oklahoma State and Baylor. After the season, he was named to the First-team Freshman All-Big 12.

Williams, as a sophomore he started in Missouri's twelve games. In his first year as a defensive tackle, Williams recorded 35 tackles, 5½ sacks and 9½ tackles for losses.

In his junior year, Williams, recorded 53 tackles, 10½ tackles for losses and 6 sacks. He also recovered 3 fumbles and forced 2 others.

As a senior, Williams was voted one of four team captains by his team members. Williams recorded 34 tackles, 12 1/2 tackles for a loss and 7 1/2 sacks. He also had 3 forced fumbles, 3 recovered fumbles, 4 blocked kicks, 2 sacks were for safeties and 1 touchdown. He finished #4 in sacks in University of Missouri football history (behind Brian Smith, Justin Smith and Aldon Smith. He was also #1 in the Big 12 in career sacks (20) in 2007. Now currently #2 behind Ndamukong Suh. He was also named First-team All-Big 12

Professional career

Baltimore Ravens
Williams was signed as an undrafted free agent by the Baltimore Ravens on April 29, 2008. He was released during the Ravens final cuts on August 30, 2008.

Montreal Alouettes
On September 20, 2008, Williams was signed to the practice squad of the Montreal Alouettes.

Carolina Panthers
Williams was signed to the practice squad of the Carolina Panthers on December 23, 2008. When his contract expired after the 2008 season he was re-signed to a future contract on January 14, 2009. He was waived on August 31.

Galactic Fun Zone
After his football career, Williams choose to become a small business owner. He opened Galactic Fun Zone, a college project, in August 2010. Galactic Fun Zone is a family entertainment center that includes Laser Tag Arcade and 8 lane Bowling Alley. He was awarded as the SBA Small Business of the Year for Innovation and Entrepreneurship in 2010.

References

External links
Carolina Panthers bio
Missouri Tigers bio
Montreal Alouettes bio

1984 births
Living people
People from Midwest City, Oklahoma
Players of American football from Oklahoma
American football defensive ends
American football defensive tackles
Missouri Tigers football players
Baltimore Ravens players
Montreal Alouettes players
Carolina Panthers players